The Rotec R2800 is a seven-cylinder 110 hp radial engine built by Rotec Aerosport Pty Ltd in Australia. The R2800 was Rotec's first (and only) engine offering when they first opened their doors in 2000. In 2005, Rotec released a more powerful variant, the Rotec R3600 which basically adds two more cylinders for a total of nine and increases the rated horsepower to 150. Both this engine and its larger cousin have been frequently used as both replacement engines for vintage World War I aircraft, and reproduction aircraft from the same vintage. Some notable repro WW I aircraft this engine has been used in are the Fokker Triplane, Sopwith Camel and the Nieuport 17. Other experimental / homebuilt aircraft have also been fitted with the Rotec 2800, including the Kitfox Model 7; a popular kit aircraft with over 5,000 examples of all variants completed. It is unknown how many Kitfox aircraft are equipped with the Rotec 2800 engine.

These engines are not limited to only aircraft applications as JRL Cycles has converted an R2800 for use in a motorcycle.

Applications

Specifications (Rotec R2800)

References

Rotec Aerosport Projects
Rotec R2800 Engine

External links
Rotec Engineering PTY LTD
JRL Radial Motorcycle

Aircraft air-cooled radial piston engines
2000s aircraft piston engines